The 12th Pan American Games were held in Mar del Plata, Argentina from March 11 to March 25, 1995.

Medals

Silver

Men's – 83 kg: Alfredo Peterson

Results by event

Taekwondo

See also
 Panama at the 1996 Summer Olympics

Nations at the 1995 Pan American Games
1995 in Panamanian sport
1995